This article contains information about the literary events and publications of 1990.

Events
March – Anton Chekhov's play Three Sisters opens at the Gate Theatre in Dublin with locally born Sinéad, Sorcha and Niamh Cusack in the title rôles and their father Cyril Cusack as Dr. Chebutykin.
March 20 – Stephen Blumberg is arrested for stealing more than 23,600 books in North America.
May 24 – Alicia Girón García is the first woman to become director of the Biblioteca Nacional de España.
c. June – J. K. Rowling has the idea for Harry Potter while on a train from Manchester to London: "I was staring out the window, and the idea for Harry just came. He appeared in my mind's eye, very fully formed. The basic idea was for a boy who didn't know what he was." She begins writing Harry Potter and the Philosopher's Stone, which will be completed in 1995 and published in 1997.
October – Nicci Gerrard marries Sean French in the London Borough of Hackney, to make up a writing team known as Nicci French.
Uncertain date – Austrian writer Ernest Bornemann is awarded the first Magnus Hirschfeld Medal for sexual research.

New books

Fiction
Felipe Alfau – Chromos (completed 1948)
Iain M. Banks – Use of Weapons
Greg Bear – Heads and Queen of Angels
Thomas Berger – Orrie's Story
Louis de Bernières – The War of Don Emmanuel's Nether Parts
William Boyd – Brazzaville Beach
Ray Bradbury – A Graveyard for Lunatics
John Bradshaw – Homecoming
A.S. Byatt – Possession (1990 Booker Prize winner)
Tom Clancy – Clear and Present Danger
Hugh Cook – The Wazir and the Witch and The Wishstone and the Wonderworkers
Bernard Cornwell – Sharpe's Waterloo and Crackdown
Michael Crichton – Jurassic Park
Jim Dodge – Stone Junction
Roddy Doyle – The Snapper
Dominick Dunne – An Inconvenient Woman
James Ellroy – L.A. Confidential
Neil Gaiman – The Sandman: The Doll's House (graphic novel; volume 2 of The Sandman series)
Neil Gaiman and Terry Pratchett – Good Omens
John Kenneth Galbraith – A Tenured Professor
John Gardner – Brokenclaw
Elizabeth George – Well-Schooled in Murder
Andrew Greeley – The Cardinal Virtues
Peter Høeg – Tales of the Night (Fortællinger om Natten)
Elizabeth Jane Howard – The Light Years, first of the Cazalet series
Robert E. Howard, L. Sprague de Camp and Lin Carter – The Conan Chronicles 2
Marsha Hunt – Joy
Monica Hughes – Invitation to the Game
P. D. James – Devices and Desires
Charles Johnson – Middle Passage (1990 National Book Award for Fiction)
Robert Jordan – The Eye of the World
Jamaica Kincaid – Lucy
Stephen King – Four Past Midnight and The Stand ("The Complete & Uncut Edition")
Hanif Kureishi – The Buddha of Suburbia
Joe R Lansdale – Savage Season
Elmore Leonard – Get Shorty
Robert Ludlum – The Bourne Ultimatum
Ian McEwan – The Innocent
Patrick McGrath – Spider
Alan Moore and David Lloyd – V for Vendetta (graphic novel)
Brian Moore – Lies of Silence
Alice Munro – Friend of My Youth (short stories)
Tim O'Brien – The Things They Carried
Orhan Pamuk – The Black Book
Robert B. Parker – Stardust
Rosamund Pilcher – September
Belva Plain – Harvest
Terry Pratchett – Eric and Moving Pictures
Thomas Pynchon – Vineland
W. G. Sebald – Vertigo (Schwindel. Gefühle)
Lucius Shepard – The Ends of the Earth
Danielle Steel – Message From Nam
James Tiptree, Jr. – Her Smoke Rose Up Forever
Christopher Tolkien (with J. R. R. Tolkien (d. 1973) and Alan Lee (illustrator)) – The War of the Ring (The History of The Lord of the Rings vol. 3; The History of Middle-earth vol. 8)
Scott Turow – The Burden of Proof
John Updike – Rabbit at Rest (1990 National Book Critics Circle Award for Fiction; 1991 Pulitzer Prize for Fiction)
Andrew Vachss – Blossom
Kurt Vonnegut – Hocus Pocus
Harry L. Watson – Liberty and Power
John Edgar Wideman – Philadelphia Fire (1991 PEN/Faulkner Award for Fiction)
Banana Yoshimoto – Amrita

Children and young people
Chris Van Allsburg – Just a Dream
Avi – The True Confessions of Charlotte Doyle
Lucy Cousins – Maisy Goes for a Swim (first in the Maisy Mouse series)
Gillian Cross – Wolf
Lynley Dodd - Slinky Malinki
Rumer Godden – Fu-Dog
Ken Kesey – Little Tricker the Squirrel Meets Big Double the Bear
Jean Marzollo – Pretend You're a Cat
Terenci Moix – Los Grandes Mitos del Cine (The Greatest Stories of Hollywood Cinema)
Inga Moore – Six-dinner Sid
Jim Murphy – The Boys' War: Confederate and Union soldiers talk about the Civil War
Bill Peet – Cock-a-doodle Dudley
Salman Rushdie – Haroun and the Sea of Stories
Dr. Seuss – Oh, the Places You'll Go
Diane Stanley – Good Queen Bess: The Story of Elizabeth I of England
Jacqueline Wilson – Glubbslyme (fantasy novel)

Drama
Brian Friel – Dancing at Lughnasa
Declan Hughes – I Can't Get Started
John Guare – Six Degrees of Separation
Girish Karnad – Taledanda (Kannada: ತಲೆದಂಡ, Death by Beheading)
Peter Shaffer – Lettice and Lovage

Poetry

Derek Walcott – Omeros

Non-fiction
Douglas Adams and Mark Carwardine – Last Chance to See
Bill Bryson – The Mother Tongue: English and How It Got That Way
Judith Butler – Gender Trouble
Cheikh Anta Diop – Alerte sous les tropiques: articles 1946–1960: culture et développement en Afrique noire (translated as Towards the African Renaissance: essays in African culture & development, 1946–1960)
Dougal Dixon – Man After Man: An Anthropology of the Future
Lawrence Durrell – Caesar's Vast Ghost: Aspects of Provence
Arun Shourie and Sita Ram Goel – Hindu Temples: What Happened to Them
Ryszard Kapuscinski – The Soccer War
Pierre Lévêque – The Birth of Greece
Michael Lynch – Scotland: A New History
Susan Mayse – Ginger: The Life and Death of Albert Goodwin
James A. Michener – Pilgrimage
Raphael Patai – The Hebrew Goddess
Ronald Reagan – An American Life
Barry Siegel – A Death in White Bear Lake
Gary Snyder – The Practice of the Wild
Hans-Jürgen Syberberg – On the Fortunes and Misfortunes of Art in Post-War Germany (Vom Unglück und Glück der Kunst in Deutschland nach dem letzten Kriege)

Births
March 29 – Kiran Millwood Hargrave, English poet, playwright and novelist
July 27 - Victoria Aveyard, American young-adult novelist
Mohamed Mbougar Sarr, Senegalese francophone fiction writer

Deaths
January 24 – Leon Kalustian, Romanian journalist, essayist and memoirist (born 1908)
February 27 – Alexandru Rosetti, Romanian linguist, editor and memoirist (burns, born 1895)
May 10 – Walker Percy, American novelist (born 1916)
May 25 – Lucy M. Boston, English children's novelist (born 1892)
July 15 – Zaim Topčić, Yugoslav and Bosnian writer (born 1920)
July 22 – Manuel Puig, Argentine novelist (heart attack, born 1932)
August 25 – Morley Callaghan, Canadian novelist, playwright and broadcasting personality (born 1903)
September 8 – Denys Watkins-Pitchford, English children's writer (born 1905)
September 26 – Alberto Moravia, Italian novelist and journalist (born 1907)
September 30 – Patrick White, Australian novelist (born 1912)
October 23 – Louis Althusser, French Marxist philosopher (heart attack, born 1918)
November 7 – Lawrence Durrell, English novelist, dramatist, and travel writer (born 1912)
November 8 – Anya Seton, American genre novelist (born 1904)
November 23 – Roald Dahl, Welsh-born children's author (myelodysplastic syndrome, born 1916)
November 24 – Dodie Smith, English novelist and dramatist (born 1899)
December 1 – Irma Chilton, Welsh children's writer in Welsh and English (born 1930)
December 7 – Reinaldo Arenas, Cuban poet, novelist, and playwright (suicide, born 1943)
December 11 – David Turner, English dramatist (born 1927)
December 14 – Friedrich Dürrenmatt, Swiss dramatist (congestive heart failure, born 1921)
December 20 – Andrea Dunbar, English playwright (born 1961)

Uncertain date
Clare Hoskyns-Abrahall, English biographer and children's writer (born 1900)

Awards
Nobel Prize for Literature: Octavio Paz
Europe Theatre Prize: Giorgio Strehler
Camões Prize: João Cabral de Melo Neto

Australia
The Australian/Vogel Literary Award: Gillian Mears, The Mint Lawn
C. J. Dennis Prize for Poetry: Robert Adamson, The Clean Dark
Kenneth Slessor Prize for Poetry: Robert Adamson, The Clean Dark
Mary Gilmore Prize: Kristopher Rassemussen, In the Name of the Father
Miles Franklin Award: Tom Flood, Oceana Fine

Canada
See 1990 Governor General's Awards for a complete list of winners and finalists for those awards.

France
Prix Goncourt: Jean Rouaud, Les Champs d'honneur
Prix Décembre: François Maspero, Les Passagers du Roissy–Express
Prix Médicis French: Les Quartiers d'hiver – Jean-Noël Pancrazi
Prix Médicis International: Amitav Ghosh, Les Feux du Bengale

United Kingdom
Booker Prize: A. S. Byatt, Possession: A Romance
Carnegie Medal for children's literature: Gillian Cross, Wolf
Cholmondeley Award: Kingsley Amis, Elaine Feinstein, Michael O'Neill
Eric Gregory Award: Nicholas Drake, Maggie Hannan, William Park, Jonathan Davidson, Lavinia Greenlaw, Don Paterson, John Wells
James Tait Black Memorial Prize for fiction: William Boyd, Brazzaville Beach
James Tait Black Memorial Prize for biography: Claire Tomalin, The Invisible Woman: The Story of Nelly Ternan and Charles Dickens
Queen's Gold Medal for Poetry: Sorley Maclean
Whitbread Best Book Award: Nicholas Mosley, Hopeful Monsters
The Sunday Express Book of the Year: J. M. Coetzee, Age of Iron

United States
Agnes Lynch Starrett Poetry Prize: Debra Allbery, Walking Distance
Aiken Taylor Award for Modern American Poetry: W. S. Merwin
Bernard F. Connors Prize for Poetry: Christopher Logue, Kings
Bobbitt National Prize for Poetry: James Merrill, The Inner Room
Caldecott Award: Ed Young, Lon Po Po: A Red–Riding Hood Story from China
Compton Crook Award: Josepha Sherman, The Shining Falcon
Frost Medal: Denise Levertov / James Laughlin
Hugo Award for Best Novel: Dan Simmons for Hyperion
National Book Award for Fiction: Charles Johnson for Middle Passage
Nebula Award: Ursula K. Le Guin, Tehanu: The Last Book of Earthsea
Newbery Medal for children's literature: Lois Lowry, Number the Stars
Pulitzer Prize for Drama: August Wilson, The Piano Lesson
Pulitzer Prize for Fiction: Oscar Hijuelos for The Mambo Kings Play Songs of Love
Pulitzer Prize for Poetry: Charles Simic: The World Doesn't End
Whiting Awards:
Fiction: Yannick Murphy, Lawrence Naumoff, Mark Richard, Christopher Tilghman, Stephen Wright
Nonfiction: Harriet Ritvo, Amy Wilentz
Plays: Tony Kushner
Poetry: Emily Hiestand, Dennis Nurkse

Elsewhere
Premio Nadal, Juan José Millás, La soledad era esto

References

 
Literature
Years of the 20th century in literature